Khalid Almoayed is a Bahraini businessman and politician.

Career
Almoayed was born in Muharraq. He holds a Bachelor’s degree in Civil Engineering at the University of Birmingham in the United Kingdom. He chairs the board of directors of the following companies:
 Khalid Almoayed & Sons
 Abdulrahman Khalil Almoayed Group
 ACE Almoayed Engineering Consultants
 Bahrain Fresh Fruits Company
 Manama Travel Centre and Manama Tours
 iMachines
 At Computers
 Mediaagenic Advertising Company
 Wells Arabia
 Infusion Hospitals
He also serves on the board of Trafco.

He was appointed to the Consultative Council, on which he served from 2006 to 2010. He was elected president of the Bahrain Chamber of Commerce and Industry 2014.

References

Bahraini businesspeople
Bahraini politicians
Members of the Consultative Council (Bahrain)